Beechwoods is a 9.8 hectare Local Nature Reserve south-east of Cambridge, England. It is owned by County Farms and managed by the Wildlife Trust for Bedfordshire, Cambridgeshire and Northamptonshire.

Beeches were planted on chalky farmland in the 1840s, and medieval plough terraces are still visible. Birds include green and great spotted woodpeckers, and nuthatches.

There is access from Worts' Causeway.

References

Local Nature Reserves in Cambridgeshire
Wildlife Trust for Bedfordshire, Cambridgeshire and Northamptonshire reserves